Pferdekopf von Waldgirmes (German), the horse's head of Waldgirmes, is the remnant of a Roman-age statue. It was found in the year 2009 on a field close to Waldgirmes in the German state of Hesse.

The head was buried 11 metres below the ground in a collapsed well shaft, hidden in a barrel, and had been found in the course of archeological excavation works of a former Roman settlement. Therefore most likely it belonged to an equestrian statue that stood on the forum of this settlement.

The piece is 59 cm long, weighs about 15 kg, and has been carefully restored. It is considered to be one of the most important archeological finds in Germany. For years, the state of Hesse and the landowner hassled about the compensation the owner was entitled to, until the district court of Limburg set it at 773.000 Euros.

Since August 19, 2018, the horse's head is presented in the Saalburgmuseum.

External links 

 Press release (German) of the Hessian ministry for science and culture

References 

Bronze
Horses in art
Equestrian statues in Germany